Buthpur or Bhoothpur is a large area in Mahbubnagar district, Telangana.

About Bhoothpur
Bhoothpur is now an area in Mahbubnagar city, it was a Mandal headquarter before 2019 in Mahbubnagar District of Telangana State, India. It is located 10 km towards East from city of Mahbubnagar.

Bhoothpur Pin code is 509382 and postal head office is Bhutpur .

Pothulamadugu ( 4 km ), Kothamolgara ( 4 km ), Palakonda ( 5 km ), Yedira(m) ( 6 km ), Kappeta ( 6 km ) are the nearby Villages to Bhoothpur. Bhoothpur is surrounded by Mahbubnagar Mandal towards west, Jadcherla Mandal towards North, Ghanpur Mandal towards South, Thimmajipet Mandal towards East .
Mahbubnagar, Badepalle, Nagarkurnool, Wanaparthy are the nearby Cities to Bhoothpur.

Geography
It has an average elevation of 473 metres (1555 ft).

This village name was Buddapur and somehow got changed to Bhoothpur. The village was named Buddapur as it was ruled by the great Gona Reddy dynasty king Gona Budda Reddy.
It was named after him.

How to Reach Bhoothpur
By Road
Mahbubnagar is the Nearest city to Bhoothpur. Mahbubnagar is 10 km from Bhoothpur. Road connectivity is there from Mahbubnagar to Bhoothpur.
By Rail
Diviti Palli Rail Way Station, Yenugonda Rail Way Station are the very nearby railway stations to Bhoothpur. Also you can consider railway Stations from Near By city Mahbubnagar. Mahbubnagar Town Rail Way Station, Mahbubnagar Rail Way Station are the railway stations near to Mahbubnagar. You can reach from Mahbubnagar to Bhoothpur by road after . How ever Hyderabad Decan Rail Way Station is major railway station 100 km near to Bhoothpur

Demographics of Bhoothpur
Telugu is the Local Language here. Total population of Bhoothpur is 5110 .Males are 2746 and Females are 2,364 living in 902 Houses. Total area of Bhoothpur is 1414 hectares.

Institutions
 Panchavati Hospital 
 Govt Junior College
 Panchavati Vidyalaya
 State Bank of India.
 New Era Talent School,  a school with in the Municipal location. Beside National Highway 44. It is furnished with all amenities
 Palamoor Private ITI

Holy places
 Shiva Temple
 Sanjevaraya Temple
 Sri Hanuman Temple.
 Sri Muni Rangaswamy Temple.
 Oldest Nandishwaraya Temple. (Nandi Temple)

Villages
The villages in Bhoothpur mandal include:
 Amisthapur 	
 Annasagar 	
 Bhattupally 	
 Bhoothpur 	
 Yelkicherla
 Hasnapoor 	
 Ippalapally 	
 Kappeta
 Karivena 	
 Kothamolgara 	
 Kothur 	
 Maddigatla 	
 Patha Molgara 	
 Pothulamadugu 	
 Thatikonda 	
 Thatiparthy
 Sheri pally(Hasnapoor)
 Sheri pally(B)

References

Mandals in Mahbubnagar district